Pollachi is a town and a taluk headquarters in Coimbatore district, Tamil Nadu state, India. Pollachi is a popular Marketplace for jaggery, vegetables and cattle. As of 2011, the town had a population of 90,180.

History
Pollachi was known as Pozhil Vaitchi in Tamil which means "gifted with beauty" and later became Pollachi. It was also known as Mudi Konda Chola Nallur during the period of the Cholas.

In 2019, the town became notable for the 2019 Pollachi sexual assault case involving the rape and extortion of numerous women by a gang.

Geography

Demographics
According to the 2011 census, Pollachi had a population of 90,180 with a sex-ratio of 1,012 females for every 1,000 males, much above the national average of 929. A total of 7,732 were under the age of six, constituting 3,952 males and 3,780 females. Scheduled Castes and Scheduled Tribes accounted for 10.57% and 0.29% of the population respectively. The average literacy of the city was 82.15%, compared to the national average of 72.99%. The city had a total of 24,755 households. There were a total of 36,972 workers, comprising 219 cultivators, 488 main agricultural laborers, 1,018 in household industries, 32,720 other workers, 2,527 marginal workers, 25 marginal cultivators, 45 marginal agricultural laborers, 124 marginal workers in household industries and 2,333 other marginal workers.

Economy

The economy of the town is predominantly dependent on agriculture. Coconut, jaggery, vegetables and cattle contribute to the agricultural output. There are also coir producing units with raw materials sourced from local farms. Vanilla is also cultivated in certain locations. Pollachi is also a popular movie shooting location for the Tamil film industry owing to its scenic landscape.

Education
Pollachi has schools which follow different curricula such as CBSE, ICSE and state board. Proximity to the educational hub of Coimbatore aids in higher education.

Transport

Road
Pollachi is linked by National Highway 209, State Highway 19, SH 78 and SH 78A. The central bus stand caters for bus transport which is used by Government-run TNSTC and private operators. State Express Transport Corporation operates long-distance buses.

Main Routes From Pollachi
Coimbatore Route
Valparai Route
Dharapuram Route
Udumalpet Route
Palladam Route
Palakkad Route
Thrissur Route

Rail
Pollachi Railway Junction connects with Palakkad to the west, Coimbatore to the north and Dindigul to the east. Metre to broad gauge conversion on Dindigul line was completed in January 2015.

Air
Coimbatore International Airport is the nearest airport, located about 48 km from Pollachi.

Places of interest

Parambikulam Wildlife Sanctuary is situated in the valley between the Anaimalai Hills of Tamil Nadu and the Nelliampathi range of Kerala. The area is hilly and rocky, drained by several rivers and is thickly forested with some marsh lands and scattered patches of grass. Parambikulam-Aliyar multipurpose project involves a series of dams interconnected by tunnels and canals at various elevations to harness the various rivers flowing through the area.

Temples
Thirumurthyswami temple is a temple dedicated to Shiva, situated in the foothills of the Thirumurthy Hills. Other major temples include Masani Amman, Eachanari Vinayagar Temple and Vethathiri Maharishi.

References

External links
 

Suburbs of Coimbatore
Cities and towns in Coimbatore district